Jack Halpern may refer to:

 Jack Halpern (chemist) (1925–2018), inorganic chemist
 Jack Halpern (linguist) (born 1946), lexicographer and linguist